Gaddar: The Traitor (also rendered Gadaar: The Traitor) is a 2015 Indian Punjabi thriller starring Manpneet Grewal, Harbhajan Mann and Amitoj Mann. The film released on 29 May 2015.

Cast
 Manpneet Grewal
 Amitoj Maan as Shaheed Rashpal Singh
 Harbhajan Mann as Jai Singh
 Ashish Duggal as SP Sandhu
 Evelyn Sharma
 Satwant Kaur as Jai's mother
 Girja Shankar
 Shavinder Mahal
 Rupinder Roopi
 Anita Meet
 Tarsem Paul CM Baldev Singh
 Balkaran Wadding
 Bobby Sandhu as Sandy

Box office

Gaddar: The Traitor collected  from international markets.

References

External links
 

2015 films
Punjabi-language Indian films
2010s Punjabi-language films
Insurgency in Punjab in fiction